Kopacz is a Polish surname and means "digger". Notable people with the surname include:

 Alexander Kopacz (born 1990), Canadian bobsledder
 Bartosz Kopacz (born 1992), Polish footballer
 David Kopacz (born 1999), Polish footballer
 Ewa Kopacz (born 1956), Polish politician, former Prime Minister of Poland
 George Kopacz (born 1941), American baseball player
 Joseph Kopacz (born 1950), American Catholic bishop
 Tibor Kopacz (1962–2009), Romanian speed skater

See also
 

Polish-language surnames